In enzymology, a glucuronokinase is an enzyme that catalyzes the chemical reaction

ATP + D-glucuronate  ADP + 1-phospho-alpha-D-glucuronate

Thus, the two substrates of this enzyme are ATP and D-glucuronate, whereas its two products are ADP and 1-phospho-alpha-D-glucuronate.

This enzyme belongs to the family of transferases, specifically those transferring phosphorus-containing groups (phosphotransferases) with an alcohol group as acceptor.  The systematic name of this enzyme class is ATP:D-glucuronate 1-phosphotransferase. Other names in common use include glucuronokinase (phosphorylating), and glucurono-glucuronokinase.  This enzyme participates in pentose and glucuronate interconversions and ascorbate and aldarate metabolism.

References

 

EC 2.7.1
Enzymes of unknown structure